Aanestad is a surname. Notable people with the surname include:

Sam Aanestad (1946–2018), American physician, surgeon, and politician
Vegard Aanestad (born 1987), Norwegian professional footballer

See also
Annestad

Norwegian-language surnames